Onore is a comune (municipality) in the Province of Bergamo in the Italian region of Lombardy, located about  northeast of Milan and about  northeast of Bergamo.

Onore borders the following municipalities: Castione della Presolana, Fino del Monte, Songavazzo.

Demographic evolution

References